A seafood basket, also known as the fisherman's basket, is a fried dish usually consisting of fried seafood including fish fillet, prawns and calamari. Additional foods used can include fried scallops, oysters and crab sticks. It typically includes one or more dipping sauces, such as cocktail sauce, and may include chips. It is a similar dish to fish and chips.

See also
 List of seafood dishes
 List of deep fried foods

References

Seafood
Food combinations